Claude Duval Payton (March 30, 1882 in Centerville, Iowa – March 1, 1955 in Los Angeles, California) was an American actor in many silent films and other films.

On stage, Claude Payton toured with the Spooner Stock Company, which was headed by his brother, Corse Payton, and his sister, Cecil Spooner. By 1914, Claude was working at the Thanhouser film producing company in New Rochelle, New York, where he mainly played the roles of villains or lawmen in Western films. Although Claude Payton survived the transition from silent movies to films with sound, in 1935 he was mainly in minor supporting roles in films. Claude retired from the filmmaking business in the mid-1940s.

Filmography

 Jean of the Wilderness (1914, Short) as Haskins (film debut)
 The Master Hand (1914, Short) as Chief of Detectives
 A Woman There Was (1919) as High Priest
 The Man Who Lost Himself (1920) as Prince Maniloff
 If I Were King (1920) as Montigney
 The Soul of Youth (1920) as Pete Moran
 Dice of Destiny (1920) as James Tierney
 When We Were 21 (1921) as Dave
 A Knight of the West (1921) as Ralph Barton 
 The Grim Comedian (1921) as (uncredited)
 The Song of Life (1922) as Central Office Man
 Two-Fisted Jefferson (1922)
 The Masked Avenger (1922) as Bruno Douglas
 Desert's Crucible (1922) as Tex Fuller
 The Men of Zanzibar (1922) as George Sheyer 
 The Desert Bridegroom (1922)
 Trooper O'Neil (1922) as Black Flood
 Do and Dare (1922) as Córdoba 
 Bells of San Juan (1922) asJim Garson
 Catch My Smoke (1922) as Tex Lynch 
 The Devil's Dooryard (1923) as Fred Bradley
 The Law Rustlers (1923) as Doc Jordan
 Desert Rider (1923) as Rufe Kinkaid 
 Skid Proof (1923) as Masters 
 The Man from Wyoming (1924) as Jack Halloway
 The Back Trail (1924) as Gentleman Harry King
 The Desert Outlaw (1924) as Black Loomis
 Daring Chances (1924) as Sampson Burke
 The Riddle Rider (1924) as Victor Raymond
 Gold and the Girl (1925) as Rankin 
 Dangerous Odds (1925)
 The Ridin' Streak (1925) as Sheriff
 The Texas Trail (1925) as Dan Merrill
 Ben-Hur (1925) as Jesus (uncredited)
 The Cohens and Kellys (1926) as Bit Role (uncredited)
 The Yellow Back (1926) as Bruce Condon
 The Western Whirlwind (1927) as Jeff Taylor
 Set Free (1927) as Burke Tanner
 The Crowd (1928) as Minor Role (uncredited)
 The Gate Crasher (1928) as Zanfield 
 Dodging Danger (1929, Short)
 Say It with Songs (1929) as Judge
 The Great Divide (1929) as Minor Role (uncredited)
 Up the River (1930) as Guard (uncredited)
 Arsène Lupin (1932) as Gendarme (uncredited) 
 The Last Frontier (1932, Serial) as Colonel Halliday
 Tex Takes a Holiday (1932) as Saunders
 Zoo in Budapest (1933) as Captain of Police (uncredited)
 Fargo Express (1933) as Goss Partner #1
 The Son of Kong (1933) as Sailor/Suspenders Peddler (uncredited)
 Thunder Over Texas (1934) as Bruce Laird
 Jealousy (1934) as Bit Role (uncredited)
 The Mighty Barnum (1934) as Spieler (uncredited)
 Les Misérables (1935) as Gendarme at Bishop's Home (uncredited)
 After the Dance (1935) as Guard (uncredited)
 The Public Menace (1935) as Detective (uncredited)
 Barbary Coast (1935) as Passenger (uncredited)
 A Night at the Opera (1935) as Police Captain (uncredited)
 One-Way Ticket (1935) as Detective (uncredited)
 Miss Pacific Fleet (1935) as Caretaker (uncredited)
 Anthony Adverse (1936) as Announcer of Guests at Ball (uncredited)
 San Quentin (1937) as Cop (uncredited)
 All American Sweetheart (1937) as Attendant (uncredited)
 Penrod and His Twin Brother (1938) as Deputy (uncredited)
 Broadway Musketeers (1938) as Policeman at Murder Scene (uncredited)
 The Spider's Web (1938, Serial) as Henchman Radarez (uncredited)
 Eternally Yours (1939) as Scotland Yard Man (uncredited)
 Tower of London (1939) as Councilman (final film) (uncredited)

References

External links

 

American male film actors
People from Centerville, Iowa
1882 births
1955 deaths
Burials at Forest Lawn Memorial Park (Glendale)
20th-century American male actors